Štrukelj is a Slovene surname. Notable people with the surname include:

Branimir Štrukelj (born 1957),  Slovenian trade unionist and politician
Januš Štrukelj (born 1991), Slovenian footballer
Marjan Štrukelj (born 1964), Slovenian slalom canoeist
Mark Tullio Strukelj (born 1962), Italian footballer
Miha Štrukelj (born 1973), Slovenian artist

Slovene-language surnames